The 2019 Rugby Americas North Championship is a rugby union championship for Tier 3 North American and Caribbean teams.

Format
This is the second edition of the tournament since the launch of the Americas Rugby Challenge, and the second consecutive year with major structural changes.

With Cayman Islands winning promotion to the Americas Rugby Challenge, and Trinidad and Tobago electing not to participate, the Championship division of both the north and south zones have been reduced to single matches, followed by a championship play-off, the winner of which will play the lower ranked North American team of the 2019 Americas Rugby Challenge for promotion. The lower Cup divisions of each zone will consist of three teams each playing in a single round robin. Also, multiple North American teams are scheduled to play one-off tests and warm-up matches for the Americas Rugby Challenge.

Also, there is no promotion and relegation between divisions planned for this year, as the 2020 edition of the tournament is expected to be part of qualification for the 2023 Rugby World Cup, and will only involve full members of World Rugby.

The following teams are scheduled to take part in the 2019 tournament. World Rankings are taken from the start of each division.

North Zone

Championship

  (73)
  (64)

Cup

  (N/A)
  (N/A)
  (N/A)

South Zone

Championship

  (N/A)
  (59)

Cup

  (81)
  (N/A)
  (N/A)

North Zone

Championship

This match was originally scheduled to be the promotion playoff after the 2018 Rugby Americas North Championship, but was reworked to be the 2019 championship proper after Cayman Islands were promoted out of the competition to the Americas Rugby Challenge.

Cup

South Zone

Championship

Cup

RAN Final Championship 2019

North ChampionShip Winner vs South ChampionShip Winner

America Challenge Play off

NACRA Champion vs Lower placed RAN team in Americas Challenge 2019

References

2019 in North American rugby union
2019 rugby union tournaments for national teams
2019 in Guadeloupe
2019 in Dominican Republic sport
2019 in Curaçao sport
2019 in Barbadian sport
2019 in Jamaican sport
2019 in Bermudian sport
2019 in Trinidad and Tobago sport
2019 in Caymanian sport
2019 in American sports